Gatehouse of Fleet is a town half in the civil parish of Girthon and half in the parish of Anwoth, divided by the river Fleet, Kirkcudbrightshire, within the district council region of Dumfries and Galloway, Scotland, which has existed since the mid-18th century, although the area has been inhabited since much earlier.

History

Much of its development was attributable to the entrepreneur James Murray's decision to build his summer home, Cally House there in 1763. The house is now the Cally Palace Hotel.

Over the next hundred years, the town developed into a centre for industry, particularly cotton mills. The western approach to the town is dominated by the imposing Cardoness Castle. Gatehouse of Fleet is the birthplace of Victorian artist John Faed. The renowned inventor of clockwork mechanisms, Robert Williamson, was also known to have set up a workshop in the town in 1778, which burned to the ground in 1794, killing him.

The town takes its name from its location near the mouth of the river called the Water of Fleet which empties into Wigtown Bay at Fleet Bay, and its former role as the "Gait House" or "the House on the Road on the River Fleet" or toll booth of the late 18th-century stagecoach route from Dumfries to Stranraer, now the A75 road. It was a haven along this route, and travellers would often stop in the area rather than further the journey at night due to the high numbers of bandits and highwaymen at the time.

Gatehouse of Fleet Town Hall, which benefits from a fine ornamental garden behind, was completed in 1885.

Cally House was designed by Robert Mylne and was constructed in 1763. The house was sold in 1933 and became a hotel, which opened in 1934. It was used as a residential school for evacuees from Glasgow during the Second World War, reopening as a hotel in the later 1940s.

The settlement of Anwoth is one mile (1.5 km) to the west of Gatehouse of Fleet; Samuel Rutherford was minister at Anwoth Old Church from 1627 to 1636.

Jeanie Donnan, (1864-1942),  "The Galloway Poetess", was born here before moving to Whithorn in Wigtownshire where she lived on George Street and where she is commemorated by a plaque. She wrote poetry about local events. Her works include Hameland: The Poems of Jeanie Donnan, 1907; War Poems, 1915; The Hills of Hame, 1930. Many of her poems were also published in the Galloway Gazette.

Church of the Resurrection, 1971 designed by Sutherland, Dickie & Copland. The church is lit by a dramatic clerestory window. Metal sculptures of the Resurrected Christ and Our Lady by Liverpool artist Arthur Dooley (1929-1994) ornament the sanctuary wall. Since the closure of this church on 1 February 2020 and ahead of its demolition, the sculptures have been removed to St Andrew and St Cuthbert Church in Kirkcudbright.

The Swallows is an artwork created in willow by local artist Lizzie Farey and was a memorial commission. The last Mass was celebrated on 1 February 2020 by the Bishop of Galloway, William Nolan and parish priest Rev Fr William McFadden. The church will be demolished and the site sold for housing.

Part of the action of Five Red Herrings, a 1931 Lord Peter Wimsey detective novel by Dorothy L. Sayers, takes place in Gatehouse of Fleet.

Scheduled Monuments 
The Gatehouse of Fleet Roman Fortlet is a Scheduled Monument, however there are no extant remains. This fortlet may have "during the campaigns of governor Agricola sometime around 81AD," and may have housed a garrison of about 80 men.

Another Scheduled Monument in the Gatehouse of Fleet is Cardoness Castle. The latter castle was built in the late 15th century by a branch of Clan McCulloch.

Notable people
Joe Ansbro the rugby player was raised near Gatehouse of Fleet and attended Gatehouse Primary School .
Katrina Bryan, the "Nina" of the CBeebies show Nina and the Neurons, was born in the town in 1980.
John Faed, James Faed, Thomas Faed, Boab Patterson-Faed and Susan Faed, members of the celebrated family of Victorian artists, were all born at Barlay Mill, Gatehouse of Fleet.
Catherwood Learmonth FRSE (1896-1981) spent his early life here
Hamish MacInnes, the well known mountaineer and pioneer of mountain rescue in Scotland was born in the town in 1930.
Sir John McMichael FRSE (1904-1993), Professor of Medicine at Hammersmith Hospital, London, Director of the British Postgraduate Medical Federation and a trustee of the Wellcome Trust, was born in the town.
Richard Gilbey, 12th Baron Vaux of Harrowden.

Provosts

Gatehouse of Fleet had a provost for part of its history: These included:

Robert Veitch, 1951-1958
Wilfred Davidson, 1962-1966

Attractions

Garries Park is adjacent to Gatehouse of Fleet and also serves as the home ground of Fleet Star FC. There is a restored mill next to the River Fleet, "The Mill on the Fleet." The road also leads to an attraction of historical significance, Cardoness Castle. Beaches near the town can be found at Carrick and Sandgreen. The Cream o' Galloway is 3 miles from the town and offers a major visitor attraction. The Clints of Dromore near the old Gatehouse of Fleet railway station provide rock-climbing.

Gatehouse Gala 
Gatehouse Gala Week consists of a series of events that take place annually in late July and early August, such that Gala Day is the first Saturday in August.

Some events throughout the week include:

 Opening ceremony
 Car treasure hunt
 "Roon the Water" run and junior fun run
 Torchlight parade followed by fireworks display
 Guided hill walk and historical walk
 Float competition 
 U16s 5-a-side football
 Bingo
 Rubber duck race
 Riding of the Marches
 Live music at the Bank o' Fleet

Each year, a "Gala Queen" (formerly "Miss Gatehouse") is elected from the Primary 7 year at Gatehouse Primary School along with a Queen's Consort. The Queen's Attendant and Queen's Page are elected from the Primary 3 year. The group of four lead the events throughout the week and hand the positions over to the newly elected at the opening ceremony of the following year's Gala.

References

External links
 Gatehouse of Fleet website
 Monumental Inscriptions for Old and New Girthon Parish Graveyards

 
Towns in Dumfries and Galloway